is a video game character created by SNK as the protagonist of their Fatal Fury series. Introduced in Fatal Fury: King of Fighters in 1991, he is an American fighter who enters the worldwide "The King of Fighters" tournaments to combat his father's murderer, Geese Howard. Following Geese's defeat, Terry becomes the guardian of Geese's son Rock Howard. He is also a regular character in the crossover video game series The King of Fighters, where he continues participating in tournaments. He has also been a guest character in other games, including the Capcom vs. SNK series, Arika’s Fighting EX Layer and Nintendo's crossover fighting game Super Smash Bros. Ultimate. In addition to video games, Terry has appeared in anime films based on Fatal Fury, and manga serialized in Comic Bom Bom.

SNK created Terry with the idea of a macho fighter which is reflected in his design. After several games, Terry was redesigned for Garou: Mark of the Wolves, where he is a more peaceful person. This had an impact on his design which was also altered for The King of Fighters games. Terry's popularity led SNK to create a female version of him for the 2018 game SNK Heroines: Tag Team Frenzy. The character has been well received, and is ranked highly in popularity polls. Publications have praised the character's personality and movesets and how he was developed from Fatal Fury to The King of Fighters, although the female Terry saw mixed reception. Terry has become an icon for not just SNK, but fighting games in general, appearing prominently on SNK and non-SNK merchandise.

Creation and design

Origin

Terry Bogard originates in the development of Capcom's fighting game Street Fighter (1987), for which developers Hiroshi Matsumoto and Takashi Nishiyama created a concept for a Caucasian man wearing a leather jacket; the concept was not used in Street Fighter, as they decided to make the main playable character a dougi-clad karateka instead. They still wanted to use this concept in a game; after their move to SNK, they implemented him in Fatal Fury: King of Fighters (1991) as a playable character. The SNK staff described his character design in the first Fatal Fury as "the most macho, stand-out, original Terry". Youchiro Soeda was in charge of the animation of most of the characters in the first Fatal Fury.

In the making of the series, Terry and his brother Andy were characterized as the heroic leads, contrasting with the comical Joe Higashi. For the release of the Fatal Fury 3 game, Terry was quickly added because of his popularity with fans. When it came to his moves, SNK had different ideas and altered the special moves he could perform. The fourth title, Real Bout Fatal Fury, was made to end the conflict between Terry and his nemesis, Geese Howard. Terry has been popular with the SNK staff to the point multiple individuals worked on his character's movesets during location tests of Real Bout Fatal Fury 2. Although the story of Garou ends on a cliffhanger, one of SNK's staff members hinted that in a possible sequel Terry and Rock would be enemies.

Designs
His appearance evolves across Fatal Fury, there were two rejected sketches. One involved a design with cowboy boots, a tattoo, and a pendant he had received from an unidentified woman. Nobyuki Kuroki handled Terry's design in the Real Bout titled games. In Mark of the Wolves, Terry was redesigned with a "cool" look by the SNK staff because they thought his previous appearance had become outdated. Yasuyuki Oda was in charge of this version of Terry with respect to the game design. Artist Falcoon considered this one of his favorite designs before he began working. He was pleased when he got the opportunity to work on the character's redesign. Falcoon said that both Terry and Mai Shiranui are his favourite SNK characters. Another reason for the change of clothing was to symbolize Terry's more peaceful personality now displayed in Mark of the Wolves.

The King of Fighters game was created with the idea of having Terry fighting against Ryo Sakazaki, the lead character from the Art of Fighting series. The King of Fighters protagonist Kyo Kusanagi was also created with this in mind. SNK said that Terry's great popularity among players made him one of the most used characters for every installment of the series.

All of the main King of Fighters games up to The King of Fighters 2002 feature Terry in his Fatal Fury 2 outfit, whereas The King of Fighters 2003 and The King of Fighters XI feature the "Mark of the Wolves" design. In the following game his classic outfit was used to remain true to his origins. For The King of Fighters XIV, the artists found Terry's new appearance challenging to the point it was remade four times along with changes by his motion actor. Yusuke Amano was the character designer for Terry in this title which he enjoyed due to his personal experience with Terry ever since he played as him in his childhood.

Female re-designs

While making SNK Heroines: Tag Team Frenzy, SNK staff noted that because Terry was one of the company's most popular characters, his inclusion in the game was necessary even if he had to be redesigned as a woman; this incarnation has feminine clothing options including a variant of his original outfit wherein the FATAL FURY logo on his cap is changed to read "FATAL CUTiE", a cheerleader outfit, and steampunk-inspired clothes. This was not the first time SNK had featured a female version of Terry in a game: in 2003's SNK vs. Capcom: SVC Chaos, he is magically transformed by the Darkstalkers character Demitri Maximoff.

Early in SNK Heroines development, the female Terry was meant to still have a masculine voice, but the decision was reversed following disapproval from the game's sound designers. Despite fears over the voice actresses' deliveries, in the end SNK felt Terry managed to fit in with the cast. Amano believed that SNK was able to explore a more humanistic take on the character through SNK Heroines.

Voice actors
Starting with Fatal Fury: The King of Fighters until Neo Geo Heroes: Ultimate Shooting Terry was voiced by Satoshi Hashimoto who also voiced fellow playable character Kim Kaphwan. When he was replaced, Hashimoto said he was happy that his roles were widely recognized by fans and that he highly enjoyed Terry's character. Takashi Kondō replaced Hashimoto for The King of Fighters XIV onward and was very aware of his character's popularity. Kondo first met the character through his childhood when playing the video games that feature him. He described his character as cool due to his demeanor.

For the three animated adaptations of Fatal Fury, the character's role was left to Kazuyoshi Nishikori. In the English dubs of the three works, Terry is voiced by Mark Hildreth.

Fighting style
For the release of Fatal Fury 3 Terry's air move Rising Tackle was removed in exchange for the Power Dunk. The Power Dunk was better for the team even though it closely resembled the Rising Tackle. Another of Terry's most iconic early moves is called the Power Geyser, where he generates a massive geyser of energy by punching the ground. Designer Nobuyuki Kuroki said there were several rejected versions of this move, but one of them was used in a later Fatal Fury game, Real Bout Fatal Fury Special. In Garou, Terry has a new move called the Buster Wolf. Designer Yasuyuki Oda said its original name was actually "God Geyser Twin", but he did not find it fitting for the Showa period when the move was added. In 2019, Oda noted that one of Terry's most popular techniques is the Buster Wolf.

When The King of Fighters was announced, Terry was quickly added into the franchise by the SNK staff, who noted "his popularity skyrocketed!" His development was overseen by many designers who "fretted over various aspects of his character". In retrospect the SNK staff noted he "became the powerhouse, getting a super punch cancel move added to his arsenal and becoming the fearsome character he is today". The ability to cancel the second hit of his standing punch move was added by one of the game's designers two hours before submitting the game's mask ROM. There were also arguments about the character's winpose, but in the end they decided on something new.

Game designer Masahiro Sakurai said he wanted to show the original appeal of Terry in Smash when including him in the game. Sakurai preferred using his Fatal Fury 2 design in Smash as he believes it is one of the most recognizable ones, most notably in the 1990s. In doing so, Terry was made to automatically look at his opponents in one-on-one fights, including jumps where the character spins. He was designed to be slower than most characters. A new move known as the Somersault Kick was created for Smash although the original moves were also retained. An airbased variation of his original projectile technique, the Power Wave, was also used to balance the character. In order to accommodate his full moveset, Terry is the only character who has different side special moves depending on whether the player inputs left or right, and can use Desperation Moves if his health reaches a critical point rather than as his Final Smash, which is a completely new move melding together his different Desperation Moves.

Appearances

In video games
Terry has served as the lead character of the Fatal Fury series since his debut in the first game. The original Fatal Fury centers around Terry and his younger brother Andy who enter the King of Fighters tournament to avenge their father Jeff Bogard's death. He was murdered a decade before by the tournament's sponsor, Geese Howard. Along with their friend Joe Higashi, they manage to defeat Geese who dies falling from a tower after fighting one of the three main characters. The numerous Fatal Fury sequels released later feature Terry and his friends competing in new tournaments. The first sequel, Fatal Fury 2, introduced a new antagonist for Terry to defeat named Wolfgang Krauser who tries to conquer Southtown. By Fatal Fury 3: Road to the Final Victory, Terry continues his fight against Geese (who survived his apparent death) and now seeks revenge against Terry and other rivals. Real Bout Fatal Fury concludes the Bogard and Howard rivalry by killing off Geese at the end of the game. Two subsequent Real Bout sequels featuring Terry were produced - Real Bout Fatal Fury Special and Real Bout Fatal Fury 2: The Newcomers (although neither game contains a storyline), along with Fatal Fury: Wild Ambition, a 3D game which retells the plot of the first game. Terry Bogard's character was reinvented for Garou: Mark of the Wolves, which features an older Terry as the mentor of Geese Howard's son, Rock Howard. During this time, Terry and Rock enter a new King of Fighters tournament dubbed Maximum Mayhem.

After the release of Fatal Fury 2, Terry appeared in The King of Fighters '94, where he serves as the leader of the game's "Fatal Fury" team alongside his younger brothers Andy and Joe. The King of Fighters series, which was originally conceived as a crossover of SNK's previous video game franchises, eventually established their own self-contained continuity set apart from the earlier Fatal Fury series, safe for the first two Fatal Fury games. Terry became a staple of both franchises. While the Fatal Fury Team's members change various times across the series, Terry remains the team's leader. In NESTS Saga storyline, depicted in The King of Fighters '99 up to The King of Fighters 2001, Terry plays much larger role on helping Mary to take down NESTS's hidden agents, mainly outside the tournaments. The King of Fighters XII and The King of Fighters XIII, including The King of Fighters XV bring back the character in his Fatal Fury 2 outfit. Terry returns in The King of Fighters XIV and XV mainly to oversee his nemesis, Geese.

The Fatal Fury Team remains as in the first KOF in the games without a storyline. They include: The King of Fighters '98, The King of Fighters 2002 and Neowave. In The King of Fighters: Kyo, a role-playing game (RPG) centered on Kyo Kusanagi, Terry appears when Kyo goes to South Town and helps him fight Geese Howard. In the two games for the Game Boy Advance titled EX: Neo Blood and EX2, the Fatal Fury Team participates in the new tournaments. The character is also present in The King of Fighters All Star in his Fatal Fury 2 and Garou personas and KOF 98: Ultimate Match Online.

He is also playable in the shooter game Sky Stage, and stars in the crossover video games NeoGeo Battle Coliseum in his Mark of the Wolves outfit and the SNK vs. Capcom series in his Fatal Fury 2 outfit. The shooting game Neo Geo Heroes: Ultimate Shooting uses him as a playable character. An alternate female version of Terry is featured in the game SNK Heroines: Tag Team Frenzy. Terry's ending is a dream that revisits the events of Geese's death, but an older Rock also throws him from a cliff before he awakes in the present where Rock had been trying to wake him up after finished cooking their breakfasts. Terry appears as a guest character in the Arika fighting game Fighting EX Layer. He is available in the King of Fighters X Fatal Fury mobile phone game, the Chinese mobile phone game called KOF: WORLD, Metal Slug Defense, the dating sim Days of Memories and the otome game King of Fighters for Girls. A pachinko based on the Orochi storyline of the series was released by SNK featuring Terry, while The Rhythm of Fighters has the character. Terry appears as a playable fighter to Super Smash Bros. Ultimate. He was released as downloadable content in November 2019, along with a stage based on Fatal Fury and The King of Fighters known as King of Fighters Stadium.

In other media 
Terry Bogard is the central character in a trilogy of Japanese animated Fatal Fury films. Two of them were original video animations (OVA) while the third was a theatrical release where his character is voiced by Shōnentai lead singer Nishikiori Kazukiyo in the Japanese originals and Mark Hildreth in the English dubs. The first two OVAs, 1992s Fatal Fury: Legend of the Hungry Wolf and 1993s Fatal Fury 2: The New Battle loosely follow the storylines of their respective games, while the third theatrical film, 1994s Fatal Fury: The Motion Picture, features an original storyline. The first OVA introduces a new love interest for Terry named Lily McGuire, an orphan raised by Geese Howard. Lily is killed by Geese during the first OVA, but she appears in both sequels as a spirit who guides Terry. The theatrical film introduced a new love interest for Terry named Sulia. She is the younger sister of the antagonist, Laocorn Gaudeamus, who sacrifices herself near the end of the film to help Terry defeat her brother. He is also present into the novelizations of The King of Fighters.

Terry plays a supporting role in the 2006 original internet animation The King of Fighters: Another Day. He appears in the episode Accede voiced in the Japanese version by his video game voice actor, Satoshi Hashimoto, and by Tony Carroll in the English dub. Satoshi Hashimoto also voiced Terry in Memories of Stray Wolves, a twenty-minute featurette which serves as a retrospective of the Fatal Fury series, with Terry narrating the games' events to Rock. Terry is featured in volume 3 of the soundtracks series SNK Character Sounds Collection released by Pony Canyon. The CD features several songs based on his character. He appears in several manhua, including the Fatal Fury series, The King of Fighters and SNK Vs. Capcom: SVC Chaos, which retell the stories of their respective games. The first seven chapters of the manhua The King of Fighters 2003 by Wing Yen feature a short chapter from Garou: Mark of the Wolves that tells of Rock's training with Terry. His character is part of a social action program created by SNK Playmore named the "Nakoruru & Terry Club". The organization supports children to guide them to a better future. David Leitch portrays Terry in the live-action 2010 film The King of Fighters, where his role is that of a CIA agent who serves as the supporting side-kick and comic-relief of Iori, Kyo, and Mai's team.

Terry is also one of the characters featured in The King of Fighters: Destiny, a CGI-animated retelling of the first game in the series, voiced by his new voice actor in the games Takashi Kondo. In this story, Terry enters a tournament with Andy and Joe to avenge Jeff like the first Fatal Fury. He begins a romantic relationship with a woman named Angelina who is an agent from Geese. As Geese is about to kill Terry, Angelina sacrifices herself to protect him and he takes down Geese. After the battle, Heidern takes Terry and Kyo to meet the real mastermind behind Geese's power, Rugal Bernstein. Although Terry is defeated, Kyo manages to overpower Rugal. Terry plays a minor role in the manga The King of Fighters G where he faces Iori Yagami during the tournament and is nearly killed in combat by his enemy. However, when the tournament is interrupted, the Bogard brothers engage in a fight against Geese and Billy Kane.

Cultural impact

Popularity

Terry is frequently used to represent the company in crossover games, merchandise and publicity. During the KOF Year-End Party in 2005, a fan event held by SNK, the character's cap was given to every fan in attendance. His character has been well received by fans, appearing in several video games popularity polls. In Gamests 1997 Heroes Collection, Terry was voted the staff's eighth favorite character. In a popularity poll by SNK for the release of Garou: Mark of the Wolves, Terry ranked second. SNK staff commented that "Terry's the eternal hero". A character popularity poll on the Neo Geo Freak website resulted in Terry as the fourth favorite character from the series with a total of 2,479 votes.

He was voted the number one fan favorite character with a total of 10,014 votes in a 2005 poll conducted by SNK-Playmore USA, which lead to his placement in the North American release of The King of Fighters: Maximum Impact to appeal to the Western gamers. For the Japanese special endings in The King of Fighters '97, three video game publications, Gamest, Famitsu and Neo Geo Freak, had to create a team composed of three characters for a special illustration. Gamest created a team composed of Terry, Blue Mary and Joe Higashi. In 2018, Terry was voted the most popular Neo Geo character. In his official blog, Falcoon reveals that both Meira brothers were initially conceptualized as the KOF counterparts to Fatal Fury stars given the game's setting is the same as their predecessors. In late 2018, Terry and other characters created by SNK appeared as part of a collaboration between other companies in Harajuku Japan involving new merchandising.

Critical response
The character has received both praise and criticism from several media publications. GameSpot reviewer Frank Provo commented that one of Fatal Furys biggest accomplishments is the creation of Terry Bogard and their use of him in later sequels. Damien McFerran praised Terry's design, saying that he is "emanating so much coolness it's little wonder that SNK otaku can always be seen wearing his trademark red cap". Dale Nardozzi of TeamXbox also praised Terry's distinct appearance. He also commented that Terry's clothes are some of the most common cosplays at every convention featuring video games. GamingExcellence's Andrew Sztein commented that Terry was one of his favorite series' character. He mentioned that he liked his design because "he should be working at Petro Canada part time" and added that his mispronunciation of English quotes is quite funny. IGN reviewer Ryan Clements also preferred Terry over all the other characters in the Fatal Fury series, commenting that he liked the way the character played in each game. Dan Whitehead from Eurogamer praised each part of Terry's appearance that makes him look cool. He noted that Terry is one of the most popular characters from Fatal Fury although he is "rather bland". UGO.com listed Terry's baseball cap thirteenth on their list of "The Coolest Helmets and Headgear in Video Games", calling it "completely badass", despite having "Fatal Fury" stitched on the front. Den of Geek placed Terry third on their "best fighting game characters" list. Editor Harry Slater commented that "Bogard is a stark reminder of the glory days of the two dimensional fighter". The English actor's voice in Maximum Impact received a good review in Hardcore Gamer magazine for fitting Terry so well.

GamesRadar called Terry "one of SNK's most memorable characters", ranking him the 86th "most memorable, influential, and badass" protagonist in games. They also listed him as the second best fighting character because of the appeal of his techniques. His role in the story, for example his adoption of Rock Howard, was also praised. In 2012, Complex ranked Terry the 11th "Most Dominant Fighting Game Character" commenting that his appearance in the least would be predictable based on his fame. 4thletter listed Terry's ending in Real Bout Fatal Fury as the best one in gaming as it not only ends his rivalry with Geese but also shows more of his relationship with Rock Howard. Arcade Sushi ranked him as the "4th best fighting game good guy" noted for more than "his hilarious English butchery". They praised his outfit and cited his moves as entertaining. Den of Geek listed him as the third best The King of Fighters character with the writer commenting on his "overthetop" moves as well as comparing him positively with Street Fighter characters Ryu and Ken Masters based on their personalities. The same site listed him as the third best fighting game character, remarking on his figure within SNK's games and his impact within gamers. WhatCulture listed him as the 18th best beat em' up character with comments focusing on his personality and initial character design that is appreciated by fans. TeamXbox referred to Terry as one of SNK's most popular characters due to the number of cosplayers based on him.

Several sites have commented on Terry's gameplay moves. Gaming Age writer Jeff Keely criticized how overpowered Terry became in The King of Fighters '99 because of his new special moves. Prima Games listed his "Burn Knuckle" as one of the 50 greatest fighting moves in video game history because Terry dashes towards his enemies in the process. Terry was given a move known as the "Buster Wolf" which was listed as one of the best techniques in fighting games by Arcade Sushi not only because of its impact, but also before landing the attack, the character ironically says "Are you okay?" Polygon recommended that newcomers to The King of Fighters XIV try Terry's movesets, despite some difficulties with mastering certain moves.

The female portrayal of Terry in SNK Heroines: Tag Team Frenzy was met with surprise. Push Square joked about the implications of the developers changing Terry's gender while Nintendo Life wondered why they did not use Alice Nakata, a female fighter who has some of Terry's moves. Nevertheless, the site found Terry's fighting style in the crossover to be promising. Despite also finding the fighter's appearance confusing, Game Informer commented that every SNK game might need Terry regardless of gender. Destructoid noted that while Terry retained his original moves, most fans were unaware that the female Terry appeared for the first time in a Japanese mobile game. Daily World News agreed with Nintendo Life questioning why SNK did not use Alice instead. They noted the most common response had been mixed and wondered if this was meant to be a joke similar to Iori Yagami's cross-dressing alter-ego, Miss X, from SNK Gals' Fighters.

Anime News Network Bamboo Dong praised Terry's character development in the Fatal Fury original video animations because they portrayed his insecurities, something rarely seen in other adaptations. Chris Beveridge of Mania Beyond Entertainment also praised the characters' development citing Terry's grief over the loss of his love interest. In contrast THEM Anime Reviews' Raphael criticized Terry's story for being told several times already in other series and also panned his final fight against Geese Howard because of the lack of regular martial arts and the use of chi-like energy instead. Although the live-action film of The King of Fighters has been panned, Beyond Hollywood said that KOFs "only saving grace ... is David Leitch, who is flat-out hilarious as world-weary CIA agent Terry Bogard. Yeah, the character doesn't make a lick of sense, but in this film, it borders on genius". Felix Vasquez of Cinema Crazed, however, criticized Terry's character in the movie calling him a "nuisance". Tyler Treese of GameRevolution has praised Terry's addition in Super Smash Bros. Ultimate by stating that "There are so many ridiculous possibilities for him to battle, and that’s exactly what makes Smash Bros. such a fun series."

SNK Allstar commercial
In October 2020, a commercial for the mobile phone game SNK Allstar showed a sequence of Terry Bogard sexually harassing Mai Shiranui, Blue Mary and Kula Diamond. This generated disgust from Kotaku, particularly since Kula is underage. The news reached SNK's company who released a statement saying the company had no part in the creation of the video and had no knowledge of its content before apologizing to fans. The company asked the creators of the video to delete the controversial advertisement.

References

Further reading

External links
Terry Bogard - Fighters Generation

Action film characters
Adoptee characters in video games
Fatal Fury characters
Fictional American people in video games
Fictional Central Intelligence Agency personnel
Fictional basketball players
Fictional kyokushin kaikan practitioners
Fictional martial artists in video games
Fictional male martial artists
Fictional mixed martial artists
Male characters in video games
Super Smash Bros. fighters
Orphan characters in video games
SNK protagonists
The King of Fighters characters
Video game characters introduced in 1991
Video game mascots